Lorenzo Bellini (3 September 1643 – 8 January 1704), Italian physician and anatomist.

Life
He was born at Florence on the September 3, 1643. At the age of twenty, when he had already begun his researches on the structure of the kidneys and had described the papillary ducts (also known as Bellini's ducts; latin: ductus Bellini, tubulus Bellini, tubuli Belliniani; see: duct of bellini, bellini duct carcinoma), as published in his book Exercitatio Anatomica de Structura Usu Renum (1662), he was chosen professor of theoretical medicine at Pisa, but soon after was transferred to the chair of anatomy. After spending thirty years at Pisa, he was invited to Florence and appointed physician to the grand duke Cosimo III, and was also made senior consulting physician to Pope Clement XI. He died at Florence on the January 8, 1704. His works were published in a collected form at Venice in 1708.

Gallery

References 

Attribution

Sources 

1643 births
1704 deaths
Italian anatomists
17th-century Italian physicians
Academic staff of the University of Pisa
Members of the Academy of Arcadians